The Chambal is a geographical and cultural region in north-central India. It lies along the Chambal and Yamuna river valleys, in southeastern Rajasthan, southwestern Uttar Pradesh and northern Madhya Pradesh.

Geography 
It covers the districts of Baran, Kota, Sawai Madhopur, Karauli, and Dholpur districts of Rajasthan, parts of Agra, Firozabad, Etawah, Auriya and Jalaun districts of UP, and Bhind, Morena and Sheopur districts of Madhya Pradesh. The region is covered by an estimated 5 Lakh hectares of badlands. It drains the northwest of the Central Vindhya Plateau and the southeastern part of the Aravalli Range. Southeastern tributaries like the Kali Sindh and Parbati begin at the extreme south of the Vindhyas and flow north in deep valleys, forming a triangular alluvial plain at elevation of 240-270 m. Afterwards the Banas, a northwestern tributary of the Chambal draining the Aravalli Range, joins the Chambal after crossing the hills near Sawai Madhopur in southeastern Rajasthan. The valley of the Chambal is wider near the confluence of the Kali Sindh and the Parbati and narrower after the confluence of the Banas. The Chambal extends to the ravines of the Choti Parbati in Rajasthan and the Kwari river in northeastern Madhya Pradesh.
The Chambal badlands are part of the greater Vindhyan Basin.

Mythology
It says to have become uncultivated when an Aryan king, Rantideva would sacrifice cows for power. This led to a priest cursing him and the land.

References

Regions of India